East Ruston Old Vicarage Gardens is a notable privately owned  garden in the county of Norfolk at East Ruston in Eastern England.

The gardens were established in 1973 by Alan Gray and Graham Robeson, who have created a  design which incorporates exuberant and innovative planting  alongside a more traditional formal design. On an unpromising site,  close to the North Sea and surrounded by arable prairie,  the gardens are protected from harsh onshore wind  by  a shelter belt of  Monterey Pine s which  created  a unique micro-climate. Exotic and unusual plants from around the world flourish alongside more hardy species. Notable are the tree ferns, succulents and palms which surround the house, as is the Californian 'Desert Wash', the Exotic Garden with a  water sculpture and  a large cornfield sown with a selection of native but now scarce 'weeds' such as cornflower, poppy and corn marigold. The gardens contain an interesting collection of sculptures by local artists as well as many architectural features.

External links

 Website

Gardens in Norfolk
Clergy houses in England
Houses in Norfolk